Klovn ("Clown") is a Danish sitcom, which first aired on the Danish TV channel TV2 Zulu.  It focuses on the life of the main character Frank (played by Frank Hvam) and Casper (played by Casper Christensen). The show builds its comedy around quiet everyday situations, social awkwardness, uncomfortable silences and general faux pas.

Klovn shares many concepts with the American sitcom Curb Your Enthusiasm by Larry David, notably the main concept of a semi-retired comedian encountering humorous and embarrassing situations, along with his wife, friends and celebrity acquaintances. The show is also held in a pseudo-realistic style where all lines are retroscripted, so a first-time viewer might be in doubt of whether or not the show is staged. Even the score is similar. In spite of this, in its closing credits, the show is claimed to be an original idea by Casper Christensen and Frank Hvam.

The sitcom consists of 78 episodes spread over 8 seasons, each episode lasting 25–30 minutes. The eighth season aired in 2021.

On 16 December 2010, Klown was released, a movie based on the series but with an original plotline, with a sequel Klown Forever released in 2015 and final movie Klovn the Final released in 2020.

Characters 
 Frank – Frank Hvam. Frank is the main character of the show. Frank is a comedian by profession and has a bad tendency to get into trouble. He often ends up in absurd situations together with his best friend, Casper.
 Casper – Casper Christensen. Casper is Frank's best friend and also a comedian/actor. He is rather ruthless and extremely promiscuous, constantly cheating on his girlfriend Iben. Frank often has to clean up the mess Casper makes and constantly takes the blame for him.
 Mia – Mia Lyhne. Mia is Frank's girlfriend throughout the entire series. She runs a tea shop together with a friend and is often dragged into the mischief that Frank and Casper make.
 Iben – Iben Hjejle. Iben is Casper's on and off girlfriend and Mia's best friend. At times she seems oblivious to Casper's adultery, seemingly focusing more on her own acting career.
 Claire – Claire Ross-Brown. Claire is Frank and Casper's secretary. She is originally British which often causes language mistakes that annoys Casper. 
 Carøe – Michael Carøe. Carøe is Frank and Casper's friend. Frank and Casper have a strange relationship with Carøe, often getting into trouble with him. In one episode it is revealed that Carøe has dealt drugs from Mia's tea shop, and Frank ultimately rats him out to the police.
 Pivert – Jacob Weble. An old friend of Frank Hvam. Pivert is not very popular with Frank's new group of friends, and especially Casper dislikes him. This is especially expressed in the episode “Godfather of drugs” where Pivert by peer pressure is forced to do heroin, causing him to black out.

Episodes

Season 1 – Based on Real Events 
 "5-års dagen" (The 5-years anniversary)
 "De nye danskere" (The new Danes)
 "Hushovmesteren" (The Butler)
 "Dalai Lama" (Dalai Lama)
 "Godfather of Drugs" (Godfather of Drugs)
 "Løft ikke hunden" (Don't lift the Dog)
 "Fars sidste ønske" (Dad's last Wish)
 "Str. 44" (Size 44)
 "Årstiderne" (The Seasons)
 "Farvel igen mor" (Goodbye again Mom)

Season 2 – It's About Sex 
 "Casa Tua" (Italian) (Casa Tua)
 "Bye Bye Bodil" (Bye Bye Bodil)
 "Don Ø affæren" (The Don Ø-Affair)
 "Thors øje" (Thor's Eye)
 "Kgl. hofnar" (Royal Jester)
 "It's a Jungle Down There" (It's a Jungle Down There)
 "Ambassadøren" (The Ambassador)
 "Carøes barnedåb" (Carøe's Christening)
 "Irma-pigen" (The Girl from Irma)
 "Franks fede ferie" (Frank's Cool Vacation)

Season 3 – On the Road to New Disasters 
 "Rosé-forbandelsen" (The Rosé-Curse)
 "London Kashmir" (London Kashmir)
 "Pepino & Pepito" (Pepino & Pepito)
 "Nina kære Nina" (Nina, dear Nina)
 "100 dage i Forum" (100 Days in Forum)
 "Biggie Blackie" (Biggie Blackie)
 "Længe leve demokratiet" (Long live Democracy)
 "Bøssernes Kennedy" (The Gays' Kennedy)
 "En revisor-smølfe-CD" (An Accountant-smurf-CD)
 "God jul, Frank" (Merry Christmas, Frank)

Season 4 – Last Chance! 
 "Unge hjerter" (Young Hearts)
 "Hjem til far" (Home to Dad)
 "Sankt Hans" (Midsummer)
 "Bornholm" (Bornholm)
 "Aben Ditmark" (Ditmark the Monkey)
 "Jarlens død" (“The Earl” ‘s Death) 
 "Piverts polterabend" (Squeaky's Bachelor Party)
 "Hejsan Sverige" (Swedish) (Hello Sweden)
 "Tango for tre" (Tango for three)
 "Ups" (Oops)

Season 5 – A Heart of Gold 
 "Mamma Mia" (Italian) (My Goodness)
 "Mere ost Christian Braad Thomsen?" (More Cheese Christian Braad Thomsen?)
 "White House Potential" (White House Potential)
 "Tak for svaneæg" (Thanks for Swan-Egg)
 "Den japanske have" (The Japanese Garden)
 "Troldmanden fra Frederiksberg" (The Wizard from Frederiksberg)
 "Hør nu efter Frank!" (Listen Frank!)
 "Tillykke Frank" (Happy Birthday Frank)
 "Drys fra muffedissen" (Sprinkle from the Wristlet)
 "Surprise Mia!" (Surprise Mia!)

Season 6 – Asstrip 
 "Guffeliguf" (Yummidy-yum)
 "Shut up" (Shut up)
 "Sivsko og Ægget" (Rush Shoes and the Egg)
 "Fru Af og Til" (Mrs. Occasionally)
 "Monsieur Le Boss" (French) (Mr. the Boss)
 "Bedragsholm Slot" (Deception-islet Manor House)
 "Bisbebjerg Tricket" (The Bispebjerg Trick)
 "Et knus for et krus" (A Mug for a Hug)
 "Dilletanterne" (The Dilettants)
 "Falsk lorte alarm" (False Shit Alarm)

Season 7 

 "Det muslimske klaver"
 "Baked Alaska"
 "#Metoo"
 "Slikræven"
 "Tipo Napoli"
 "Kender du typen"
 "Dobbelt dip"
 "Hvil i fred Mia"
 "Mia's måne"
 "B.S. Skalaen"

Season 8 

 "Spild af Pingus"
 "Frank the prank"
 "Min bedste ven"
 "Balling vs Bahs"
 "Det gamle testamente"
 "Falsk Pykker-alarm"
 "Forstanderen"
 "Dr. Strangelove"

International broadcasts

References

External links
 
 

Danish comedy television series
2000s Danish television series
2005 Danish television series debuts
2009 Danish television series endings
Danish-language television shows
TV 2 Zulu original programming